The South Gibson School Corporation is the largest of the three public school governing institutions in both enrollment and territory covered in Gibson County, Indiana as well as one of the ten largest in enrollment in Southwestern Indiana. The SGSC is responsible for a district including four townships of southern and southwestern Gibson County; Johnson, Montgomery, Union, Wabash, and parts of Barton, Center and Patoka Townships within Gibson County as well as drawing in students from Northern Vanderburgh and Posey Counties. It consists of a superintendent, a five-member school board, eight principals and vice principals and employs around 190 teachers and specialists. The SGSC's renovation of the then-35-year-old Gibson Southern High School was complete as of 2010-11 School Year.

The facilities of the SGSC
 South Gibson has no central Middle School
 Note: Coal Mine Road is often signed as both 800S on its east terminus (Fort Branch End) and 400W  on its north terminus (Indiana 168 or Owensville End) with the curve being about 200 feet west of the  Gibson Southern High School Campus.

Other facilities
 Southern Indiana Career & Technical Center (Shared with 7 other school corporations)

Former facilities
Fort Branch Marlette High School*
Haubstadt Johnson High School*
Owensville Montgomery High School*
 Merged to form Gibson Southern High School in 1974.

Neighboring corporations
East Gibson School Corporation
Evansville Vanderburgh School Corporation
M.S.D. North Posey
North Gibson School Corporation
Warrick County School Corporation

References

Resources
 South Gibson Homepage: http://www.sgibson.k12.in.us/index.htm
 Gibson Southern High School Renovation: Gibson Southern High School Renovation Project
 Schematic Design Report 02-06-07 | Wayback Machine

School districts in Indiana
Education in Gibson County, Indiana
Southwestern Indiana
Fort Branch, Indiana
Haubstadt, Indiana
Owensville, Indiana